James Bridie (19 September 1857 – third ¼ 1893) was a Scottish-born rugby union Centre who played club rugby union for Cardiff, and Newport and county rugby for Monmouthshire.

Rugby career
Bridie was born in Greenock in 1857 and was educated in Madras College, St. Andrews, before moving to Wales. In the 1881 census he was described as a rope agent and was living in the centre of Cardiff with his wife Marion. Although playing for several south-eastern Welsh clubs, he is most notable as a Newport player.

During the 1885/1886 season, Bridie had found work in Bradford, and left behind his connections with Welsh rugby. Still wishing to continue playing rugby he joined local club Manningham FC. After just playing one game for Manningham he turned out for bitter rivals Bradford, before switching back to Manningham FC. The Manningham supporters, created a chant based on the derogatory nursery rhyme, Taffy was a Welshman; despite the fact that Bridie was deemed not to be Welsh by the Scottish rugby fraternity.

 Bridie was a Welshman
 Bradford was a thief.
 Bradford came to our house,
 and now we are in grief.

Bibliography

References

1857 births
1893 deaths
Bradford F.C. players
Cardiff RFC players
Greenock Wanderers RFC players
Manningham F.C. players
Monmouthshire County RFC players
Newport RFC players
Penarth RFC players
People educated at Madras College
Rugby union players from Greenock
Rugby union scrum-halves
Scottish rugby union players
Wales international rugby union players